A bronze sculpture of Ernest Gruening, the American journalist and politician of the same name, by George Anthonisen is installed in the United States Capitol Visitor Center, in Washington, D.C., as part of the National Statuary Hall Collection. The statue was gifted by the U.S. state of Alaska in 1977.

References

1977 establishments in Washington, D.C.
Bronze sculptures in Washington, D.C.
Gruening
Sculptures of men in Washington, D.C.